Curius is a genus of beetles in the subfamily Cerambycinae, it is the only genus in the tribe Curiini, and contains the following species:

 Curius chemsaki Nearns & Ray, 2006
 Curius dentatus Newman, 1840
 Curius panamensis Bates, 1885
 Curius punctatus (Fisher, 1932)

References

Cerambycinae